Kapildeo Singh was an Indian Socialist leader and the General Secretary of the Samajwadi Party.

Life

Singh was a veteran follower of Ram Manohar Lohia and designated the new Samajwadi Party's ideology as one based on socialist ideals of Mahatma Gandhi and Ram Manohar Lohia. He took an active part in the freedom struggle and political emancipation of the masses after independence. He died in 2002, and his funeral was attended by both Mulayam Singh Yadav and Laloo Yadav.

References

People from Bihar
Indian socialists
Samajwadi Party politicians
2002 deaths
Year of birth missing
State cabinet ministers of Bihar
Janata Party politicians
Janata Dal politicians